La Sentinelle is a commune in northern France.

La Sentinelle may also refer to:
La Sentinelle (film) or The Sentinel, a 1992 French film
"La Sentinelle" (novelette), a 2003 novelette by Lucy Sussex
La Sentinelle (Mauritius), a media company in Mauritius
"La Sentinelle", a song by Luke

See also
La Sentinelle perdue, a part of the Îlots des Apôtres in the Crozet Archipelago
Sentinel (disambiguation)